The Kulayarāja Tantra (Tibetan phonetically: Kunjed Gyalpo, ; "All-Creating King", "Supreme Source") is a Buddhist Tantra in the Tibetan language and the principal 'mind-series' (Wylie: sems sde) text of the Dzogchen tradition.

The Kunjed Gyalpo is framed as a teaching by the first Buddha, Samantabhadra to Vajrasattva. Samantabhadra is presented as the personification of bodhi-citta, the Awakened Mind, the "mind of perfect purity" or "pure perfect presence". The colophon of the text mentions that it was explained by the Indian Śrī Siṃha and translated by Vairotsana.

According to the Tibetologist David Germano, the Kunjed Gyalpo "is the main canonical work of the Great Perfection as it emerges from the  "dark period" (850 to 1000 C. E.) into the light of the economic and religious transformations of the eleventh century. While the dark period was marked by economic depression, political decentralization, and a paucity of historical records, it was thus also apparently the site of these non-institutionalized developments of early Vajrayana movements that resulted in the gradual articulation of a self-conscious Great Perfection movement in Tibet, as well as the more graphically tantric Mahayoga systems."

The Kunjed Gyalpo contains within it smaller Dzogchen texts (from the early 18 semde texts) such as the Cuckoo of Rigpa (Rig pa'i khu byug) which appears in the thirty first chapter, as such it appears to be a sort of compilation of earlier semde literature.

Name and structure 
The full title of the original work in Sanskrit is the Sarvadharma Mahasandhi Bodhichitta Kulayarāja Tantra or alternately Sarvadharma Mahāshānti Bodhicitta Kulayarāja Tantra, where mahāsandhi" (great perfection) is replaced with "mahāshānti" (great peace). In Tibetan (rendered phonetically) it is Chö Tamched Dzogpa Chenpo Changchub Kyi Sem Kunjed Gyalpo. This can be translated "The All-Creating King of Awakened Mind, the Great Perfection of all Things."

According to Namkhai Norbu, Sarvadharma "indicates the totality of phenomena of existence" while Mahasandhi "means that everything is perfect or complete, nothing is lacking." He further states:

Regarding Kulayaraja or Kunjed Gyalpo, Norbu comments:

According to Norbu and Clemente, the text contains 84 chapters divided into three main sections, Longchenpa divided these into the sections shown below:

 The Root Tantra (the first 57 chapters), associated with the wisdom derived from listening. It is meant for practitioners of the highest capacity who attain self-liberation immediately on listening and perceiving the true nature of mind.
 Ten Chapters on Primordial Manifestation which according to Longchenpa "demonstrate the true condition of the totality of existence (essence, nature, and energy) in the same way that sight is restored to a blind man."
 Ten Chapters that Disclose the True Nature which according to Longchenpa "demonstrate the perfect condition of the nature of mind as it is, using logical reasoning, examples, and meanings in the same way that a truthful person relates the contents of a letter."
 Ten Chapters Beyond Cause and Effect which according to Longchenpa "demonstrate that the nature of mind cannot be altered, achieved, or eliminated; it is just like celestial space."
 Ten Chapters on Perfection Beyond Action which according to Longchenpa "demonstrate that the qualities of self-arising wisdom, that is, of the nature of mind, are already naturally present and self-perfected and that there is no need to seek them. Simply abiding in the state of total relaxation, effortlessly, and without correction or alteration, one achieves realization. Thus, [the true  nature] can be compared to the wish-fulfilling jewel."
 Ten Chapters that Establish Knowledge which according to Longchenpa "smash the  huge rocks of erroneous views of the lower vehicles, and at the same time they illuminate the true meaning of the natural state, thus they can be compared to a diamond or to the splendor of the sun."
 Three Chapters that Summarize the Essence 
 The four chapters that concisely explain the meaning of the words
 The Further Tantra (the following 12), associated with the wisdom derived from reflection. It is meant for practitioners of average capacity who need to reflect. It contains various chapters on understanding the true meaning of the ten natures.
 The Final Tantra (the last 15 chapters), associated with the wisdom derived from meditation. It is meant for practitioners of lower capacity who need to meditate. It contains the teachings on meditation on the true meaning of the ten natures.

Main themes

The Supreme Source, Pure Perfect Presence 
The Kunjed Gyalpo is framed as a dialogue between the "first Buddha" (Adibuddha) known as Kunjed Gyalpo (All-Creating King) or Kuntuzangpo (Skt. Samantabhadra, Always Good) and Sattvavajra (Vajrasattva, "Vajra Being"). According to Jim Valby,

The "All-Creating, Pure Perfect Presence" is said to magically display or manifest all phenomena including the five aggregates, five elements, the five bodies (kayas) of the Buddha, the five passions (attachment, anger, pride, ignorance, and jealousy) and five wisdoms, all buddhas of the three times, all sentient beings of the three realms and the animate and inanimate universe. In the tantra, Samantabhadra often states that he ("I") has "created" all of these things, however, as Namkhai Norbu explains, this does not mean there is some being called Samantabhadra that "has concretely done something", instead what it refers to is that all things arise from "the state of consciousness Samantabhadra, the state of dharmakaya."

Furthermore, Samantabhadra states that the 'All-Creating King', is the essence of all things, beings and Buddhas and that to know this Awakened Mind is to attain the essence of Reality. Samantabhadra states that the "All-Creating Sovereign, mind of perfect purity" is the "existential ground (gnas chen) of all Buddhas" as well as the ground, "cause", "stem", and "root" of all things. The Kunjed Gyalpo also states "there is no other Buddha besides me, the All-Creating One," and "all that exists is my own being. The entirety of the animated and inanimated world is my own being."

Thus, all dualistic existence arises from this fundamental pure conscious source. It does not arise at some point in the past, but is always arising from consciousness. To recognize this source, there is no path one needs to follow, one merely needs to recognize that the true nature of the five passions is one's own conscious state, these are the five self-arising wisdoms.

Samantabhadra also states that "the characteristic of the self-originated pristine awareness is indestructibility...the three aspects of my nature are to be known as follows: (1) unborn, (2), without termination, and (3) the source for the wonder of ceaseless creation ... My own-being [svabhava, essence] is the sole reality."

The ultimate awakened reality is also described as 'pure and total consciousness'. It is presented as a fundamental essential substance, not engendered by causes and conditions. It is a true essence that is possessed of self-arisen wisdom that governs all things, both animate and inanimate, and which bestows life on all.

The essence of the Supreme Source is described by Samantabhadra as follows:

Atiyoga and the nine vehicles 
This text also states that there are ultimately nine vehicles to liberation, all of which arise from the same primordial state or supreme source. Liberation is when a being recognizes their own bodhicitta (mind of awakening) or mind of perfect purity. The nine vehicles are "the three sutric vehicles of the sravakas, pratyekabuddhas, and Bodhisattvas; the three outer tantric vehicles, kriya, ubhaya, and yoga (which are sometimes grouped into one vehicle: sattvayoga); and the three inner tantric vehicles, mahayoga, anuyoga, and atiyoga." The highest and supreme vehicle to liberation is Atiyoga (Utmost or Transcendent Yoga, i.e. Dzogchen, "Great Perfection"), which is an "effortless path of the recognition of pure non-dual presence" that is unencumbered by the elements of the other lower vehicles.

The core of the Dzogchen view is based on the definitive view of self-perfection, which holds that "the fruit of enlightenment is already perfected and is not something to construct through effort because it has existed from the very beginning." All the other vehicles are said to work with the provisional teaching (i.e. conventional, not ultimate) related to cause and effect and thus they do not understand the true meaning.

Nevertheless, it is stated in chapter 10 that a Dzogchen practitioner must be aware of all the teachings of the lower vehicles and know how to use them. This is because, as Norbu states, "any method can prove useful as long as it is practiced in the spirit of Dzogchen." Also, according to Norbu, even though the meditations of the lower vehicles remain at the dualistic level, "by means of these methods we can gradually attain the state beyond dualism."

Furthermore, according to the Kunjed Gyalpo, the Atiyoga/Dzogchen vehicle is different than tantric vehicles because while tantric practice is based on ten fundamental points, called the "ten natures of Tantra", Dzogchen instead is based "ten absences" (med pa bcu):

 There is no view on which one has to meditate.
 There is no commitment, or samaya, one has to keep.
 There is no capacity for spiritual action one has to seek.
 There is no mandala one has to create.
 There is no initiation one has to receive.
 There is no path one has to tread.
 There are no levels of realization (bhumis) one has to achieve through purification.
 There is no conduct one has to adopt, or abandon.
 From the beginning, self-arising wisdom has been free of obstacles.
 Self-perfection is beyond hope and fear.

These ten points are a key topic of this tantra, and are "repeated and explained from various angles in different parts of the book and constitute the fundamental feature that distinguishes Dzogchen from the other paths of realization, which are all, to a greater or lesser degree, bound to the notion of cause and effect." According to Namkhai Norbu, these ten classic points of tantra are absent in Dzogchen because "they are ways of correcting or altering the true nature of the individual, but in reality there is nothing to change or to improve, all that is necessary is to discover the real condition and to remain relaxed in that state."

When the topics of tantra are taken up, they are re-interpreted from the perspective of Dzogchen. For example, the teacher or guru in Dzogchen ultimately refers to what manifests from within our real condition and not to someone outside of oneself. Likewise, samaya (tantric commitments or vows) in Dzogchen does not refer to any particular rules one has to observe, rather it is "when, in daily life, one remains in the natural state, abiding in awareness and presence."

Meditation 

As noted by Sam van Schaik, in the Kunjed Gyalpo "one finds a rejection of the elaborate imagery and practices" of the Mahayoga (Anuttarayoga) tantras. Namkhai Norbu explains how Dzogchen, being its own vehicle, does not rely on the means of the path of transformation (i.e. tantra, Vajrayana):

Chapter 29 of the Kunjed Gyalpo contains an important series of verses on the practice of tregchod: "Do not correct your body, Do not meditate on the deity, Do not correct your voice, Do not concentrate or visualize, Do not correct the mind (rang lu ma cho Iha ma gom, mawai tsigtang  ngag ma  cho,  tingdzin ma  Jed  sem  ma  cho)." This refers to not adopting any specific posture (just relaxing), not to visualize a deity, recite mantras or practice breath exercises, and not to focus the mind on anything in particular. Instead, the Kunjed Gyalpo states: "You need only discover what is, without correcting or seeking to construct something new. Unless you attain knowledge of the authentic condition you will never liberate yourself."

Chapter 31 contains the six vajra verses of the Cuckoo of Rigpa, which encapsulates the Dzogchen perspective on meditation as follows:

Commentaries 

Longchenpa (Wylie: kLong chen rab 'byams pa, 1308–1364) wrote a commentary on this tantra entitled: The Jewel Ship: A Guide to the Meaning of the Supreme Ordering Principle in the Universe, the State of Pure and Total Presence (byang chub kyi sems kun byed rgyal po'i don khrid rin chen sgru bo). This was translated into English by Lipman & Peterson (1987) in "You Are the Eyes of the World".

According to David Germano, Longchenpa outlines the following contemplative system in his commentary on the Kunjed Gyalpo:

Khenpo Thubten Pema Rabgye (19th century) wrote a longer commentary, the Ornament of the State of Samantabhadra: Commentary on The All-Creating King, Pure Perfect Presence, Great Perfection of All Phenomena. It has been translated by Jim Valby in six volumes.

The modern Dzogchen teacher Chogyal Namkhai Norbu has given an oral commentary, which can be found in The Supreme Source, The Fundamental Tantra of Dzogchen Semde, Kunjed Gyalpo (1999).

See also 
Adi-Buddha
Anunatva-Apurnatva-Nirdesa
Buddha-nature
Creator in Buddhism
Immanence
Mahāyāna Mahāparinirvāṇa Sūtra
Panentheism
Śūnyatā
Śrīmālādevī Siṃhanāda Sūtra
Tathāgatagarbha Sūtra

References

Citations

Works cited 
The Sovereign All-Creating Mind, tr. by E.K. Neumaier-Dargyay (Sri Satguru Publications, Delhi, 1992), p. 111 and passim
The Supreme Source, C. Norbu, A. Clemente (Snow Lion Publications, Ithaca, NY, 1999)
Skora, Kerry Martin (1996). [https://web.archive.org/web/20080521044840/http://ccbs.ntu.edu.tw/FULLTEXT/JR-PHIL/ew027217.htm A Review of 'The Sovereign All-Creating Mind－The Motherly Buddha: A Translation of the Kun byed rgyal po'i mdo', by E. K. Neumaier-Dargyay (1992). SUNY Series in Buddhist Studies. Albany: State University of New York Press]. Philosophy East and West 46 (1), 107-116. (accessed: Sunday July 6, 2008)
Rabjam, Longchen (Longchenpa) (1987, 2000). You Are the Eyes of the World. (translation of Longchenpa's guide to the meaning of the kun byed rgyal po by Kennard Lipman & Merrill Peterson and with an introduction by Namkhai Norbu). Originally published by Lotsawa (Novato, California), Revised edition published by Snow Lion Publications (Ithaca, New York), now an imprint of Shambhala Publications (Boulder, Colorado); Revised Edition. ; 

Dzogchen texts
Nyingma tantras